Broad City is an American television sitcom that premiered on January 22, 2014, on Comedy Central. The series was created by and stars Ilana Glazer and Abbi Jacobson as two best friends who navigate everyday life in New York City.

The series ended on March 28, 2019 after five seasons and 50 episodes.

Series overview

Episodes

Season 1 (2014)

Season 2 (2015)

Season 3 (2016)

Season 4 (2017)

Season 5 (2019)

Ratings

References

External links
 at Comedy Central

Lists of American LGBT-related television series episodes
Lists of American sitcom episodes
Lists of sex comedy television series episodes